Odoardo Fischetti (Naples, 1770/04/30 – Naples, 1827/11/15) was an Italian painter (first Kingdom of Naples and then Kingdom of the Two Sicilies) of landscapes and history paintings in a Neoclassical style.

Biography
Odoardo Maria Saverio was born in Naples on April the 30th of 1770, son of the court painter Fedele Fischetti and of Marianna Borrelli. He became a master of design at the Royal College of the Navy in 1809. In 1803–1804, he helped his father in the fresco decoration of the Palace of Portici. In 1805, he prepared some vedute in gouache depicting an Eruption at Vesuvius. With the arrival of the French Napoleonic administration of Joachim Murat, he painted a series of historical canvases, including Murat from Massa Lubrense directs the capture of Capri, and its companion Capture of Capri by French (1808).

After the fall of Murat he continued to paint mainly sacred subjects including the 1821 Virgin, St Biagio, Andrea, Erasmo and Alfonso Maria de Liguori.
and The transport of the Arca Santa to the roof of San Biagio in Cardito (1823).

Some years after he died in Naples on November the 15th of 1827. He left a widow (his 2nd wife Maria Giuseppa Milzi) and a childhood of 9 (4 boys and 5 girls), 4 of which from his 1st wife (Emilia Catozzi).

References

1780 births
18th-century Italian painters
Italian male painters
19th-century Italian painters
19th-century Italian male artists
Italian neoclassical painters
Painters from Naples
Year of death missing
18th-century Italian male artists